Janno Kivisild (born 5 August 1977) is an Estonian football coach. He is currently an assistant manager of the Estonia national football team. He holds a UEFA Pro License.

References

External links
 

1977 births
Living people
People from Kohila
Estonian football managers
FC Flora managers
Estonian expatriate football managers